Maximiliano Juan Rogoski (born 17 June 1994) is an Argentine professional footballer who plays as a midfielder for Ferrocarril Midland.

Career
Rogoski is a product of the Tigre academy. In 2015, the midfielder completed a move to Primera D Metropolitana team Leandro N. Alem. He scored three goals in thirty-five matches across 2015–16 and 2016–17 as the club won promotion as runners-up. In Primera C Metropolitana, Rogoski featured in sixty-two matches and netted eight goals in two seasons. Midway through 2019, Rogoski headed across the fourth tier to Ferrocarril Midland. Five goals in twenty-eight games occurred across the next eighteen months. In February 2021, Rogoski was signed on loan by Primera División side Arsenal de Sarandí.

Rogoski's top-flight debut arrived with Arsenal on 7 March 2021 during a 5–0 defeat at home to Estudiantes, as he replaced Ignacio Gariglio off the bench with twenty-four minutes remaining.

Career statistics
.

Notes

References

External links

1994 births
Living people
Place of birth missing (living people)
Argentine footballers
Association football midfielders
Primera D Metropolitana players
Primera C Metropolitana players
Argentine Primera División players
Club Leandro N. Alem players
Club Ferrocarril Midland players
Arsenal de Sarandí footballers